He Cong (simplified Chinese: 贺聪; traditional Chinese: 賀聰; pinyin: Hè Cōng; born November 5, 1995) is a Chinese fashion model.

Early life 
He was born in Changsha, the capital city of Hunan province, China.

Career 
He began her modeling career in 2013, when Valentino hosted a special show in Shanghai. She was selected to open and close the show.

In 2017's autumn/winter season, He walked 42 shows, the most of any model of color that season. She was also ranked as one the top three runway models of that season by Models.com.

He has walked for brands including Chanel, Fendi, Dior, and Alexander McQueen. She has starred in campaigns for Burberry, Coach, Fendi, Bulgari, Prada, Chanel, Stella McCartney, and Dior Beauty.

He has appeared on the covers of international editions of Vogue, V Magazine, T Magazine China, Harper’s Bazaar China, Elle China, Wallpaper and Marie Claire China.

He currently ranks on Models.com's "Industry Icons" and "The Money" lists. In 2022, she joined The Business of Fashion's "BoF 500" list.

References 

1995 births
Living people